Hildebran is a town in Burke County, North Carolina, United States. The population was 2,023 at the 2010 census. It is part of the Hickory-Lenoir-Morganton Metropolitan Statistical Area.

History
There are two conflicting stories from where the name Hildebran came from. The one more accepted is that it was named after 19th-century land owner Solomon Hildebrand and his son Jacob; the other is that it was named after the 11th-century Pope Gregory VII (Hildebrand of Sovana). When Hildebran received its charter in 1899, the "d" was dropped from the name.

Geography
Hildebran is located in eastern Burke County at  (35.718432, -81.418780). Its southeastern border is also the border with Catawba County. The town of Long View borders Hildebran to the east, and the census-designated place of Icard borders Hildebran to the west. Interstate 40 follows the town's southern border, with access from exits 118 and 119. U.S. Route 70 passes through the center of the town, leading east  to Hickory and west  to Morganton.

Demographics

2020 census

As of the 2020 United States census, there were 1,679 people, 822 households, and 558 families residing in the town.

2000 census
As of the census of 2000, there were 1,472 people, 597 households, and 416 families residing in the town. The population density was 657.4 people per square mile (253.7/km2). There were 626 housing units at an average density of 279.6 per square mile (107.9/km2). The racial makeup of the town was 92.73% White, 1.15% African American, 0.54% Native American, 4.42% Asian, 0.54% from other races, and 0.61% from two or more races. Hispanic or Latino of any race were 0.68% of the population.

There were 597 households, out of which 26.8% had children under the age of 18 living with them, 53.8% were married couples living together, 11.7% had a female householder with no husband present, and 30.3% were non-families. 24.8% of all households were made up of individuals, and 10.4% had someone living alone who was 65 years of age or older. The average household size was 2.41 and the average family size was 2.88.

In the town, the population was spread out, with 22.6% under the age of 18, 7.3% from 18 to 24, 29.8% from 25 to 44, 22.8% from 45 to 64, and 17.6% who were 65 years of age or older. The median age was 38 years. For every 100 females, there were 85.6 males. For every 100 females age 18 and over, there were 83.0 males.

The median income for a household in the town was $34,028, and the median income for a family was $43,542. Males had a median income of $28,500 versus $22,765 for females. The per capita income for the town was $15,835. About 6.0% of families and 8.6% of the population were below the poverty line, including 6.2% of those under age 18 and 20.0% of those age 65 or over.

References

External links

 Town website
 Hildebran News

Towns in Burke County, North Carolina